Ladies and Gentlemen is the second album by Lou Bega, released in 2001.

Track listing
"Just a Gigolo/I Ain't Got Nobody" - 3:49
"You Are My Sunshine" - 3:30
"Calling Her" - 0:52
"God Is a Woman" - 4:05
"Club Elitaire" - 5:03
"Money" - 3:08
"Lady" - 3:27
"Gentleman" - 3:26
"People Lovin' Me" - 3:51
"Crash" - 1:10
"Shit Happens" - 3:23
"Angelina" - 3:17
"Yeah Yeah" - 3:51
"My Answering Machine" - 0:50
"Lonely" - 3:39
"Baby Keep Smiling" (Feat. Compay Segundo) - 3:36

Chart performance

Credits
Vocals: Lou Bega (main performer), Compay Segundo
Producer: Frank Lio, Axel Breitung, Peter Hoff, Donald Fact, DJ Thomilla, Goar B, Zippy Davids
Guitar: Uwe Metzler
Keyboards: Peter Hoff, DJ Thomilla
Harp: Andreas Vollenweider
Horn: Till Brönner
Horn arrangements: Till Brönner
Backing vocals: Axel Breitung, David Whitley, Peter Hoff
Engineering: Peter Hoff, Till Brönner
Mixing: Peter Hoff
Scratching: DJ Thomilla
Cover art: Ronald Reinsberg
Styling: Angelika M. Zwerenz

2001 albums
Lou Bega albums